The figure skating events in 1998 Winter Olympics were held at the White Ring in Nagano. There were no changes in the format or scoring systems from 1994. Professionals were again allowed to compete, although they had to declare that intention and compete in ISU-approved events to do so. Previously, the ISU had been accused of rejecting Western professionals, while allowing Eastern Bloc state-sponsored "amateurs" to compete. Most of the top competitors by 1998 were now openly professional.

The competitions took place on the following days:
 Pairs: 8–10 February 1998
 Men's singles: 12–14 February 1998
 Ice dance: 13–16 February 1998
 Ladies' singles: 18–20 February 1998
 Exhibition gala: 21 February 1998

Medal summary

Medalists

Medal table

Participating NOCs
Thirty-five nations competed in the figure skating events at Nagano.

Results

Men
The favourites and top two after the short program were Ilia Kulik and Elvis Stojko, who would skate first and last, respectively. Medal contenders Alexei Yagudin, Todd Eldredge and Philippe Candeloro went in between. Steven Cousins was the other skater in the final draw, but he was not considered to have a realistic chance of making the podium.

Kulik skated a flawless program which included a quad toe loop to open the last session. Yagudin, who was one of several athletes suffering from the flu during these games, fell on his quad attempt and his triple Axel, which took him out of medal contention. Eldredge was skating cleanly until he popped what was to be his second triple Axel, and then he fell again when he tried to complete the jump again in the closing seconds. Candeloro, with the exception of a step out on his triple Axel, skated his program flawlessly to end up second in the free skating. Stojko, who skated last, originally intended to perform a quad toe loop/triple toe loop combination. However, a partial groin tear and the flu prevented him from attempting the combo, so he downgraded his quad to a triple. Despite his injury, he skated a clean program but finished the free skating third, placing second overall behind Kulik.

The countries represented by the podium finishers were the same as in the men's competition at the Lillehammer 1994 games, with Stojko and Candeloro getting their second consecutive silver and bronze medals, respectively. In a noteworthy instance, Stojko had to limp to the podium on sneakers at the medal presentation. He also did not skate at the figure skating gala, although he did take the ice briefly to announce that he would skip the World Championships next month.

Referee:
  Britta Lindgren

Assistant Referee:
  Junko Hiramatsu

Judges:
  Margaret Worsfold
  Vladislav Petukov
  Sally Rehorick
  Mariana Silvia Chita
  Mieko Fujimora
  Sviatoslav Babenko
  Evgenia Bogdanova
  Paula Naughton
  Marie-Reine Le Gougne
  Zsofia Wagner (substitute)

Ladies
The primary contenders for the gold medal were Americans Tara Lipinski and Michelle Kwan. Kwan and Lipinski were in first and second place respectively after the short program. In the free skating, both Lipinski and Kwan skated clean. 6 judges placed Lipinski ahead of Kwan, and three placed Kwan ahead of Lipinski, which meant Lipinski won the gold medal, and Kwan took the silver.

The primary competitors for the bronze medal were Maria Butyrskaya and Irina Slutskaya from Russia, and Chen Lu from China. In the free skating, they all skated well, but had mistakes. The final placements were very close. The 3rd–5th place votes were split unevenly between Chen, Butyrskaya, and Slutskaya. Chen beat Butyrskaya by the tally of 5 judges to 4 and beat Slutskaya 6 judges to 3, giving Chen her second straight bronze medal in the Olympic Games.

Tara Lipinski (gold), Michelle Kwan (silver) and Chen Lu (bronze) were the World Champions in 1997, 1996 and 1995, respectively. Lipinski also became the youngest competitor in Winter Olympics history to earn a gold medal in an individual event.

While not a medal winner, France's injured Surya Bonaly, who placed 10th, completed an (illegal) backflip during her long program, making her the fourth person and only woman to ever land a backflip in competition. She is the only person to land on one foot and to do a split mid-air (now colloquially referred to as a 'Bonaly'). She performed the unorthodox maneuver as a result of a previous fall and poor program due to an injured foot, however given the illegal nature of the move, her backflip was not considered when grading her technical merit.

FS=Free Skating

SP=Short Program, FS=Free Skating

Referee:
  Sally-Anne Stapleford

Assistant Referee:
  Tjasa Andrée-Prosenc

Judges:
  Frank A. Parsons
  Judit Furst-Tombor
  Karin Ehrhardt
  Jan Hoffmann
  Susan A. Johnson
  Anatoli Bogatyrev
  Alfred Korytek
  Maria Miller
  Anne Hardy Thomas
  Liliana Strechova (substitute)

Pairs
Artur Dmitriev of Russia won his second Olympic gold here. He had previously won in 1992 with a different partner. He was the first man to win the Olympics more than once with different partners. The first woman to do so was Russian skater Irina Rodnina, who won three Olympics with two different partners.

Full results

Referee:
  Walburga Grimm

Assistant Referee:
 Ronald T. Pfenning

Judges:
  Yang Jiasheng
  John Greenwood
  Heinz-Ulrich Walther
  Anna Sierocka
  Roger A. Glenn
  Olga Záková
  Donald McKnight
  Marina Sanaya
  Alfred Korytek
  Marie-Reine Le Gougne (substitute)

Ice dance
Grishuk and Platov became the first pair ever to repeat as champions in Olympic Ice Dance. They won 21 straight events before they won in Nagano.

The judging was marred by accusations that the Europeans colluded in "bloc voting" (where judges tend to favor skaters from their regions), so that the dance teams representing their countries would take the medals, while keeping the Canadians off the podium.

Full results

Referee:
  Wolfgang Kunz

Assistant Referee:
  Alexander Gorshkov

Judges:
  Jean Senft
  Halina Gordon-Półtorak
  Eugenia Gasiorowska
  Yuri Balkov
  Ulf Denzer
  Jarmila Portová
  Alla Shekhovtsova
  Walter Zuccaro
  Jean-Bernard Hamel
  Robert J. Horen (substitute)

References

External links
 1998 Winter Olympics at Skate Canada
 1998 Winter Olympics at Ice Skating International
 Judges Scoring of Ladies Free Skating-all skaters

Men
 THE XVIII WINTER GAMES: FIGURE SKATING; Kulik of Russia Rides His Quad to Figure-Skating Gold
 Stojko wins silver for second time L.A. Times
Ladies
 Kwan Lipinski Short program Washington Post
 Lipinski wins Sports Illystrated
Pairs
 Dmitriev Kazakova New York Times
 Gold and Silver go to Russia New York Times
Dance
 Grishuk and Platov win again! L.A. Times 

 
1998 Winter Olympics events
1998
1998 in figure skating
International figure skating competitions hosted by Japan